James William Glaser (December 16, 1937 – April 6, 2019) was an American country music artist. He was born in Spalding, Nebraska.

Biography
The brother of country singers Chuck and Tompall Glaser, he performed as both a solo artist and alongside his two brothers in the group Tompall and the Glaser Brothers. His early career as a backup vocalist included a long stint with singer/songwriter Marty Robbins.  Shortly before beginning his solo recording career he had two major hits as songwriter in 1964, the top 5 "What Does it Take" which was recorded by Skeeter Davis and the top 40 "Thanks a Lot for Tryin' Anyway" recorded by Liz Anderson and later covered in albums by Jan Howard and Connie Smith. His biggest songwriting success was "Woman, Woman" a number 4 pop hit recorded by Gary Puckett & The Union Gap in 1967, and charting again for Glaser himself in 1975.

As a solo artist, Jim Glaser recorded four studio albums, and charted several singles on the Hot Country Songs charts, including the Number One hit "You're Gettin' to Me Again". Out of his three brothers, he was the only one to have a Number One hit. He was selected by the Academy of Country Music as Best New Male Vocalist in 1984. In 1979 he recorded the first version of the song "Who Were You Thinkin' Of," which he co-wrote with Cathie Pelletier and Paul Gauvin; it was later recorded by The Texas Tornados, among others.

Glaser died of a heart attack on April 6, 2019, at the age of 81.

Discography
Studio albums

Singles

References

1937 births
2019 deaths
American country guitarists
American country singer-songwriters
MCA Records artists
People from Spalding, Nebraska
Country musicians from Nebraska
Singer-songwriters from Nebraska